The Best of Billy "Crash" Craddock is the name of two albums:

The Best of Billy "Crash" Craddock (1973 album)
The Best of Billy "Crash" Craddock (1982 album)